Oakamoor is a civil parish in the district of Staffordshire Moorlands, Staffordshire, England. It contains 16 listed buildings that are recorded in the National Heritage List for England.  All the listed buildings are designated at Grade II, the lowest of the three grades, which is applied to "buildings of national importance and special interest".  The parish includes the village of Oakamoor and the surrounding area.  The listed buildings include a country house with its stables and lodges, smaller houses and cottages, two churches, the retaining wall of lime kilns, a former railway crossing keeper's cottage, a bridge, a school, and a war memorial.


Buildings

References

Citations

Sources

Lists of listed buildings in Staffordshire